The Campeonato Nacional de Fútbol Femenino (English: Women's Football National Championship) is the highest league of women's football in Nicaragua. Established in 1996, it is run by FENIFUT.

Competition format
The current format which was adopted in 2002 features ten teams playing a double round-robin. After those the six best placed teams advance to the playoffs. Three matches are played over two legs. The three winners and the best loser advance to the semi-finals. Those and the final are the contested over two legs too.

Clubs
The following ten clubs competed in the 2022 Clausura.

 Águilas de León
 El 26
 Juventus
 Leyendas
 Managua
 Real Estelí
 Somotillo
 UNAN Managua
 Walter Ferretti
 Zacarías

Former clubs

 All Stars
 Caruna RL
 Diriangén
 Jalapa
 Deportivo Kol-8
 Masaya
 F.C. Ocotal
 Pinolero F.C.
 Rivas FC
 FC Santos DEI
 Saúl Álvarez 
 Las Segovias
 UAM
 UCA

Champions
The list of all finals:

 UAM is the team of the Universidad Americana
 UCA is the team of the Universidad Centroamericana.
 UNAN is the team of the Universidad Nacional Autónoma de Nicaragua

In July 2013 UNAN won the first Torneo Nacional de Copa del Futbol Femenino de Primera División.

See also
 Women's association football around the world

References

External links
 
 Nicaragua Football Federation

Women's association football leagues in Central America
Women
Women's sports leagues in Nicaragua